The year 2008 is the 20th year in the history of Shooto, a mixed martial arts promotion based in Japan. In 2008 Shooto held 22 events beginning with, Shooto: Back To Our Roots 7.

Title fights

Events list

Shooto: Back To Our Roots 7

Shooto: Back To Our Roots 7 was an event held on January 26, 2008 at Korakuen Hall in Tokyo, Japan.

Results

Shooto: Shooting Disco 4: Born in the Fighting

Shooto: Shooting Disco 4: Born in the Fighting was an event held on February 23, 2008 at Shinjuku Face in Tokyo, Japan.

Results

Shooto: Gig West 9

Shooto: Gig West 9 was an event held on March 15, 2008 at Azalea Taisho Hall in Osaka, Kansai, Japan.

Results

Shooto: Gig Central 14

Shooto: Gig Central 14 was an event held on March 16, 2008 at Tokai TV Telepia Hall in Nagoya, Aichi, Japan.

Results

Shooto: 3/21 in Kitazawa Town Hall

Shooto: 3/21 in Kitazawa Town Hall was an event held on March 21, 2008 at Kitazawa Town Hall in Setagaya, Tokyo, Japan.

Results

Shooto: Gig Torao 1

Shooto: Gig Torao 1 was an event held on March 23, 2008 at Fukuyama Industrial Exchange Center in Fukuyama, Hiroshima, Japan.

Results

Shooto: Back To Our Roots 8

Shooto: Back To Our Roots 8 was an event held on March 28, 2008 at Korakuen Hall in Tokyo, Japan.

Results

Shooto: Shooto Tradition 1

Shooto: Shooto Tradition 1 was an event held on May 3, 2008 at Tokyo Dome City Hall in Tokyo, Japan.

Results

Shooto: Grapplingman 7

Shooto: Grapplingman 7 was an event held on May 18, 2008 at Hiroshima Industrial Hall in Hiroshima, Japan.

Results

Shooto: Gig North 2

Shooto: Gig North 2 was an event held on May 25, 2008 at Zepp Sapporo in Sapporo, Hokkaido, Japan.

Results

Shooto: Shooting Disco 5: Earth, Wind and Fighter

Shooto: Shooting Disco 5: Earth, Wind and Fighter was an event held on June 21, 2008 at Shinjuku Face in Tokyo, Japan.

Results

Shooto: 6/26 in Kitazawa Town Hall

Shooto: 6/26 in Kitazawa Town Hall was an event held on June 26, 2008 at Kitazawa Town Hall in Setagaya, Tokyo, Japan.

Results

Shooto: Shooto Tradition 2

Shooto: Shooto Tradition 2 was an event held on July 18, 2008 at Korakuen Hall in Tokyo, Japan.

Results

Shooto: Gig Central 15

Shooto: Gig Central 15 was an event held on August 3, 2008 at Zepp Nagoya in Nagoya, Aichi, Japan.

Results

Shooto: Gig West 10

Shooto: Gig West 10 was an event held on September 20, 2008 at Azalea Taisho Hall in Osaka, Kansai, Japan.

Results

Shooto: Shooto Tradition 3

Shooto: Shooto Tradition 3 was an event held on September 28, 2008 at Korakuen Hall in Tokyo, Japan.

Results

Shooto: Shooting Disco 6: Glory Shines In You

Shooto: Shooting Disco 6: Glory Shines In You was an event held on October 5, 2008 at Shinjuku Face in Tokyo, Japan.

Results

Shooto: 10/13 in Kitazawa Town Hall

Shooto: 10/13 in Kitazawa Town Hall was an event held on October 13, 2008 in Kitazawa, Japan.

Results

Shooto: Gig Central 16

Shooto: Gig Central 16 was an event held on October 26, 2008 at Tokai TV Telepia Hall in Nagoya, Aichi, Japan.

Results

Shooto: Gig North 3

Shooto: Gig North 3 was an event held on November 22, 2008 at Zepp Sapporo in Sapporo, Hokkaido, Japan.

Results

Shooto: Shooto Tradition 4

Shooto: Shooto Tradition 4 was an event held on November 29, 2008 at Korakuen Hall in Tokyo, Japan.

Results

Shooto: The Rookie Tournament 2008 Final

Shooto: The Rookie Tournament 2008 Final was an event held on December 13, 2008 at Shinjuku Face in Tokyo, Japan.

Results

See also 
 Shooto
 List of Shooto champions
 List of Shooto Events

References

Shooto events
2008 in mixed martial arts